Howard Kelsey (born 8 August 1957) is a Canadian basketball player. He competed in the men's tournament at the 1984 Summer Olympics.

Biography
Kelsey was in the seventh grade when he first starting playing basketball, in a local church league. In high school, Kelsey set the record for the career scoring average in British Columbia. He later played for Oklahoma State and Principia College, before turning professional, playing for Leones Negroes in Guadalajara, Mexico.

Kelsey represented Canada more than 400 times in international matches, including competing at the Olympic Games. He won a gold medal at the 1978 Commonwealth Basketball Championships, and the 1983 FISU World University Games. In 1981, he was also part of Canada's team in their first ever win against the United States in a major tournament.

Following his playing career, Kelsey became an athletics co-ordinator at the University of Victoria, before becoming the executive vice-president of Canada Basketball in 2010.

In 2012, Kelsey was inducted into the British Columbia Sports Hall of Fame, and in 2019, he was inducted into the Canadian Basketball Hall of Fame.

References

External links
 

1957 births
Living people
Basketball players at the 1984 Summer Olympics
Basketball players from Vancouver
Canadian expatriate basketball people in the United States
Canadian men's basketball players
1982 FIBA World Championship players
Oklahoma State Cowboys basketball players
Olympic basketball players of Canada